The Royal Tombs of Sipán Museum is a museum in Lambayeque, Peru. It contains most of the important artifacts (ceremonial vessels, necklaces and jewelry) found at Huaca Rajada by archeologist Walter Alva in 1987, including the Lord of Sipán and his entourage. The museum was inaugurated in 2002.
The museum was designed to resemble the ancient Moche tombs.

See also 
 Lord of Sipán
 Brüning Museum

References

External links

Archaeological museums in Peru
Buildings and structures in Lambayeque Region
Museums established in 2002
2002 establishments in Peru
Tourist attractions in Lambayeque Region